John Cavanagh (born August 20, 1955) is an American activist. He was the Director of the Institute for Policy Studies in Washington, D.C. from 1998 to 2021, and is a founding fellow of the Transnational Institute.

Career
Cavanagh earned a B.A. from Dartmouth College and an M.A. from Princeton University.

He worked as an international economist for the United Nations Conference on Trade and Development from 1978 to 1981, and the World Health Organization from 1981 to 1982. He directed IPS's Global Economy Project from 1983 to 1997. Cavanagh helped establish the International Forum on Globalization in 1995, and has been active in the anti-North American Free Trade Agreement networks.

Cavanagh works closely with the Congressional Progressive Caucus and the AFL–CIO. Cavanagh currently sits on the board of directors of the International Forum on Globalization.

Works
He is the co-author of 10 books and numerous articles on globalisation.

References

American economists
Living people
Dartmouth College alumni
Princeton University alumni
Writers about globalization
1955 births